Nicholas Colthurst may refer to:

Sir Nicholas Colthurst, 3rd Baronet (died 1795), MP for Clonakilty and St Johnstown
Sir Nicholas Colthurst, 4th Baronet (1789–1829), MP for Cork City

See also
Colthurst (disambiguation)